Triaenophoridae is a family of flatworms belonging to the order Bothriocephalidea.

Genera

Genera:
 Abothrium Van Beneden, 1871
 Ailinella Gil de Pertierra & Semenas, 2006
 Amphicotyle Diesing, 1863

References

Platyhelminthes